Eupselia beatella is a species of the family Depressariidae that occurs in Australia, where it has been recorded from Queensland, New South Wales and the Australian Capital Territory.

References

Moths described in 1864
Eupselia
Moths of Australia